INS Karanj (S21) was a  diesel-electric submarine of the Indian Navy.

The ship was named after the Karanja island, also known as Uran island, located in the Raigad district of Maharashtra.

Popular culture
The 2017 film Ghazi, features the story of men aboard S21 who managed to survive underwater for 18 days.

References

Foxtrot-class submarines
Ships built in the Soviet Union
1968 ships
Kalvari-class submarines